Nagampeta is a village in the Jammikunta mandal, Karimnagar district, Telangana, India. It is 7 km northeast of Jammikunta town proper.

Villages in Karimnagar district